Duguetia staudtii is a medium-sized evergreen tree within the Annonaceae family. Species is one of four within the genus Duguetia that is native to Africa.

Description 
Tree grows up to 36 meters tall. Straight, cylindrical trunk that can be branchless for up to 20 meters, stem bark is rarely scaly, commonly thick and soft and yellow or grey-green in colour. Leaf:  simple, alternate arrangement, petiole, 0.2 - 0.5 cm. Leaf-blade, narrowly elliptical to obovate in outline, 10 x 24 cm long and 2 x 5 cm wide; dark green upper surface is coriaceous and glabrous while lower surface is duller.

Distribution 
Occurs in Tropical West and Central Africa, from Sierra Leone to the Central African Republic and southwards to Gabon and the Democratic Republic of Congo. It is locally called Ntom in Central African Republic.

Chemistry 
Stem bark contains the bioactive compounds, 2,4,5 trimethoxystyrene and 1-(2,4,5- trimethoxyphenyl)-ethanone. It contains members of the group of alkaloids: berberines, tetrahydroprotoberberines and aporphines.

Uses 
Bark extracts used by traditional healers as treatment for bronchitis, toothache, edema and head lice. Wood used as timber in local carpentry work, especially as planks or for poles in house construction.

References 

Flora of West Tropical Africa
Flora of the Democratic Republic of the Congo
Annonaceae